American Idols Live! Tour 2008 was a summer concert tour in the United States and Canada that featured the top 10 contestants of the seventh season of American Idol, which aired in 2008.  This tour followed in the tradition of other American Idol summer tours following the completion of the season in May.  The 53-date tour started in Glendale and ended in Tulsa.

The tour was sponsored by Kellogg's Pop-Tarts and Guitar Hero.

Performers

Show overview
In a departure from previous tours, where the shows consisted of many duets and/or group performances, shows from this tour were crafted as a series of mini-concerts for each contestant because of the diverse talent working in different genres.

The participants of the tour themselves had planned on an ensemble performance as revealed by David Cook on EW.com's Idolatry, where the possibility of a live collaboration of "Barracuda" featuring himself on guitar, Jason Castro on drums and Carly Smithson on vocals was mooted.  The suggestion was however rejected by Idol tour  producers.

Set list

 Chikezie: "I Believe to My Soul" (Donny Hathaway), "Caught Up" (Usher), "So High" (John Legend)
 Ramiele Malubay: "I Want You Back" (The Jackson Five), "Love Will Lead You Back" (Taylor Dayne), "If I Never See Your Face Again" (Maroon 5 featuring Rihanna)
 Michael Johns: "We Will Rock You"/"We Are the Champions" (Queen), "It's All Wrong, But It's All Right" (Dolly Parton), "Dream On" (Aerosmith)
 Kristy Lee Cook: "Squeezin' the Love Outta You" (Redmon and Vale), "God Bless the USA" (Lee Greenwood), "Cowgirls" (Kerry Harvick).
 Carly Smithson: "Bring Me to Life" (Evanescence), "Crazy on You" (Heart), "I Drove All Night" (Cyndi Lauper)
 Brooke White: "Let It Be" (The Beatles), "1234" (Feist), "Yellow" (Coldplay)
 10th – 5th place contestants: "Pride (In the Name of Love)" (U2)

Intermission

 Jason Castro: "Over the Rainbow" (Israel Kamakawiwo'ole), "Crazy" (Gnarls Barkley), "Daydream" (The Lovin' Spoonful)
 Syesha Mercado: "Umbrella" (Rihanna), "If I Ain't Got You" (Alicia Keys), "Listen" (Beyoncé)
 David Archuleta: "Angels" (Robbie Williams), "Apologize" (OneRepublic), "Stand by Me" (Ben E. King)/"Beautiful Girls" (Sean Kingston), "When You Say You Love Me" (Josh Groban)
 David Cook: "Hello" (Lionel Richie), "The Time of My Life" (David Cook), "I Don't Want to Miss a Thing" (Aerosmith), "My Hero" (Foo Fighters), "Billie Jean" (Michael Jackson/Chris Cornell)
 All 10 contestants: "Don't Stop the Music" (Rihanna)

Additional notes
 During the intermission, a video of the Top 10 performing "We're An American Idol Band" in 70s outfit was shown as part of Guitar Hero World Tour rockumentary, and a Guitar Hero contest for the some members of audience was held.

Tour dates

Response 
The 2008 tour was far more successful than 2007's. Sales were up 38% in revenue per date and average attendance number up 35% compared to 2007. The average percentage of seats filled was 85.1% compared to season six's 68.4%; and 9 out of 53 shows were sold out.

It is ranked as the 24th biggest grossing tour of 2008 on Billboard's Year-End Music Charts, earning $29,906,507 from a total of 493,296 tickets sold.

Idols in Concert for the Holidays
Due to the success of the 2008 tour, Fox and 19 Entertainment have decided to hold a tour called Idols in Concert for the Holidays. The former Idol contestants headlining the tour include David Hernandez (season 7), Diana DeGarmo (season 3), Kimberley Locke (season 2) and Chikezie (season 7).

References

External links
Tour info from the American Idol official website
Poptarts Tour Website

American Idol concert tours
2008 concert tours